Patricia Hermine Sloane (November 21, 1934 – November 21, 2001) was an American painter, author, and professor of fine arts at NYC Technical College of the City University of New York. She was best known for her abstract expressionism painting style, which can be interpreted as early street or urban art, with a close connection to the New York school movement. She was a member of the 10th Street Galleries (specifically the Camino Gallery) in New York City during the 1950s and 1960s. Sloane's books included topics on fine arts, art history, principles of color, and the works of T. S. Eliot. She was married to Kenneth Campbell, a sculptor and artist.

Education

 1954 – Hans Hoffman School of Fine Arts
 1955 – BFA – Rhode Island School of Design
 1958 – National Academy of Design
 1968 – MA – City University of New York – CUNY – Hunter College
 1972 – PhD – New York University – NYU

Her PhD dissertation was "The Description of Color: A Critique of Nineteenth and Twentieth Century Color Theory".

Career

She was a frequent contributor to the Village Voice with critical writings as well as drawings. In 1956 she was an instructor at Ohio University. She also taught at the Jewish Community Center in Providence, RI, the Scarsdale Community Workshop, 1965, URI, Community College of New York, Trenton Jr. College, and she spent the latter part of her teaching career as a full professor at the City University of New York. In addition, she was a gallery lecturer at the Whitney Museum, and was awarded a Guggenheim Fellowship in 1974.

Collections
Her paintings have been displayed at:
 MoMA – Museum of Modern Art
 University of Notre Dame
 Burgenland Landesregierung – Austria
 Oblanstini Municipay Museum – Czechoslovakia

Recognition
Guggenheim Memorial Foundation – Received One Year Fellowship for "Studies in Color Theory" in 1974 for 1974–75 Academic Year (John Simon Guggenheim Memorial Foundation).

Exhibitions
 The Riverdale YMHA
 Gallery 195, NYC, 1958
 Camino Gallery, 1961
 Providence Art Club, Brata Gallery, (solo) 1963
 Emmanuel Midtown YMHA, 1964
 Chelsea Exhibit, St. Peter’s Episcopal Church, 1964
 Silvermine Art Guild, 1967
 Grand Central Moderns, (solo) 1968
 Fordham University, URI, 1968
 University of Maryland Art Gallery, 1971
 Stamford Museum, 1972
 Landmark Gallery, 1973
 Bronx Museum of the Arts, 1975
 Phoenix Gallery Tenth Street Days exhibition, 1978
 Grace Gallery of New York Technical College (solo), 1983
 Olin Fine Arts Center (solo) 1984

References

Abstract expressionist artists
20th-century American painters
Modern painters